Malekabad (also Romanized as Malekābād) is a village in Nur Ali Beyk Rural District, in the Central District of Saveh County, Markazi Province, Iran. At the 2006 census, its population was 32, in 6 families.

References 

Populated places in Saveh County